Listvyanka is an urban locality (a work settlement) in Irkutsky District of Irkutsk Oblast, Russia, located  from Irkutsk, near the Primorsky Range and the point where the Angara River leaves Lake Baikal. Population:

Transportation
Listvyanka is accessible by bus or ferry from Irkutsk.

Climate 
Normally temperatures drop down below .

Gallery

References

External links

Urban-type settlements in Irkutsk Oblast
Irkutsk Governorate
Populated places on Lake Baikal